René Bader (7 August 1922 – 1995) was a Swiss football forward and Trainer.

Career 
Bader played for FC Basel between 1946 and 1953. In 1947 Basel won the Swiss Cup as they beat Lausanne 3–0 in the final at the Stadion Neufeld in Bern. Paul Stöcklin scored two goals and Bader the other.

Between 1952 and 1955 and again during the season 1958–59 Bader was trainer of the Basel team. Basel won their first league title in 1953, with club legend Bader as player-manager. Basel ended the season three points ahead of BSC Young Boys. The team line up under Manager Bader that year was Werner Schley, Walter Müller, Walter Bannwart, Walter Bielser, Werner Bopp, Hansruedi Fitze, Hans Hügi, Josef "Sepp" Hügi, René Bader, Kurt Maurer, Georges Mogoy, Peter Redolfi, Kurt Thalmann, Hans Weber.

Bader played for the Swiss national team in the 1950 FIFA World Cup in Brazil. He scored the first goal in the game that Switzerland won 2–1 against Mexico in Estádio dos Eucaliptos, Porto Alegre, on 2 July. The Swiss finished in third position in the group and therefore dropped out of the competition.

Titles and Honours
Basel as player
 Swiss Cup winner: 1947

International
 Player at the FIFA World Cup: 1950

Basel as player-manager
 Swiss Super League Champion: 1952/1953

References

External links
FIFA profile

1922 births
Swiss men's footballers
Switzerland international footballers
Association football forwards
FC Basel players
1950 FIFA World Cup players
Swiss football managers
FC Basel managers
1995 deaths
Footballers from Basel